Mons Dilip is a mountain (hill) on the Moon, located in King, an impact crater (along with other peaks Mons André, Mons Ardeshir, Mons Dieter), at . The mountain was named Dilip, an Indian male name, in 1976.

References

External links 
Mons Dilip at The Moon Wiki

LQ14 quadrangle
Mountains on the Moon